, colloquially Urawa Reds (浦和レッズ, Urawa Rezzu), also known as Mitsubishi Urawa Football Club from April 1992 to January 1996, is a professional football club in the city of Saitama, part of the Greater Tokyo Area in Japan. The club plays in the J1 League, the top tier of football in the country. Its name comes from the former city of Urawa, now part of Saitama.

The name Red Diamonds alludes to the club's pre-professional era parent company Mitsubishi. The corporation's logo consists of three red diamonds, one of which remains within the current club badge.

History
Mitsubishi Heavy Industries established a football club in 1950 in Kobe and moved the club to Tokyo in 1958. In 1965 it formed the Japan Soccer League (JSL) along with today's JEF United Chiba, Kashiwa Reysol, Cerezo Osaka, Sanfrecce Hiroshima and three other clubs who have since been relegated to regional leagues ("Original Eight").

Mitsubishi first won the JSL championship in 1969, as a break in Mazda/Sanfrecce's dominance (and also with the fact that Toyo were in Bangkok, Thailand, competing in the Asian Club Cup); their runs up the first division were sporadic but steady until the 1980s when they fell into the Second Division. In 1990 they were promoted as JSL Division 2 champions, and thus were ready when the J-League implementation began in earnest. Urawa Red Diamonds was an original member ("Original Ten") of the J.League in 1993.

Mitsubishi were the first Japanese club to complete a domestic treble, when in 1978 they won the title, the Emperor's Cup and the Japan Soccer League Cup.

The club has enjoyed mixed fortunes since the J-League advent. The club finished bottom of the league for the first two seasons of the J-League with an average crowd of under 15,000. In 1999 they suffered relegation to the second tier of Japanese football yet again. The club has since improved in form in recent years, starting with a 2003 victory in the Nabisco Cup.

In 2006 Urawa clinched their first professional league title by defeating runners-up Gamba Osaka 3–2 on December 2 before 63,000 supporters. This came after two close calls in the previous two years.  In 2005, they finished 2nd, one point behind champions Gamba Osaka. In 2004, they finished 3rd in the first stage and won the second stage. Having qualified for the two-match J.League Championship decider, they lost on penalty kicks to Yokohama F. Marinos.

Urawa were back to back Emperor's Cup winners in 2005 and 2006. Winning the title for the first time since establishment as a professional club, they defeated Shimizu S-Pulse 2–1 on January 1, 2006, and retained the title in 2007 with a 1–0 win over Gamba Osaka. This win also completed a league-cup double. In the 2007 tournament they were defeated at the first hurdle by J2 outfit Ehime FC.

In 2007, despite a seemingly unassailable lead of seven points with four games remaining, Urawa picked up only two points from their final four games. This run included losing at home to Kashima Antlers; the club who would leapfrog Urawa on the final day of the season to claim their fifth J.League title. Following their capitulation in the fourth round of the Emperor's Cup to J2 outfit Ehime FC, Urawa had to be content with their 2007 Asian Champions League title. Urawa recorded their first international title after overcoming Iranian club Sepahan F.C. 3–1 on aggregate. The victory made them the first Japanese side to win the title since the competition was reorganised from the Asian Champions Cup in 2003. In the Club World Cup of the same year, Urawa became the first AFC club to finish in third place, beating Tunisian Étoile Sportive du Sahel side on penalty kicks in the third / fourth place play off.

In 2008, Urawa attempted to win their second consecutive Asian Champions League title and progressed to the semi finals where they were defeated by fellow J-League rivals, and eventual Champions League winners, Gamba Osaka 3–1 on aggregate.

On March 8, 2014, a banner which read "JAPANESE ONLY" was hung at one of the entrances to the stands. As punishment for this racist behavior, the March 23 match was played in an empty stadium.

International affiliation
The club is also notable in that former Feyenoord midfielder Shinji Ono began his professional career playing for Urawa. Ono returned for the 2006 season for a second stint with the club. Urawa is affiliated with German club FC Bayern Munich, whose nickname is also "The Reds". Karl-Heinz Rummenigge, the chairman of the FC Bayern Munich, announced that "We have been looking for clubs which have potential ability, management stability and cordial confidence. We could fulfill the desire to affiliate with this great club, Urawa Reds." Some other foreign clubs, such as Arsenal F.C., Club Atlético Independiente, Clube de Regatas do Flamengo, VfB Stuttgart, Manchester United F.C., Feyenoord, Hamburger SV and Perth Glory FC, visited Japan and played friendly games at the Saitama Stadium.

In August 2004, Urawa appeared in a pre-season four-club friendly tournament, the Vodafone Cup, at Old Trafford, the home of Manchester United.  The Japanese club, missing key players, lost their first game 5–2 against the Argentinian side Boca Juniors.  The second fixture against the hosts, Manchester United, was called off due to a massive electric storm.  Some 800 Urawa fans had travelled to the game and were later compensated.

The club's supporters also have an unofficial relationship with Shanghai Shenhua. The clubs' supporters will support each other in continental competition. For example, Shenhua fans will support Urawa when Urawa plays in Shanghai against Shanghai SIPG.

Stadium

Since the establishment of J.League in 1992, the club had used the Urawa Komaba Stadium as its home stadium. Due to the increasing popularity of the matches, Saitama City, owner of the stadium, expanded the seat capacity. During the renovation, the club used Ōmiya Park Soccer Stadium. In spite of the poor performance of the club, the stadium was filled with faithful supporters, drawing an average audience of twenty thousand people.

In October 2001, Saitama Prefecture built new football-specific Saitama Stadium in Saitama city. This stadium was used as a venue for the 2002 FIFA World Cup. After the World Cup the club gradually increased home games in Saitama Stadium and in 2003 the stadium was formally designated as the home stadium. In 2008, only two games were held at Komaba Stadium.

Facilities
Urawa Reds uses Ohara City Field for training. In addition to this facility, the club opened Redsland in 2005, which has three grass fields, one artificial turf field, one baseball field, futsal courts and tennis courts. Redsland is opened to the public and club members can use the facilities at relatively cheap fees.

Mascots 
The Red Diamonds have 4 mascots; Redia, Friendia, Schale, and Diarra. However, Redia doesn't make much appearances at Saitama Stadium, due to the club's policy of the stadium being a "place for serious competition". When he does occasionally appear at the stadium, he does not participate in any fan activities. Because of this, Reds fans dubbed him as a NEET mascot (which is an acronym for "No education, employment, or training"). According to the club profile, Redia and Friendia were married during a Reds fan festival in 1997. The younger twin mascots, Schale and Diarra, were born on the day the Red Diamonds won their first J. League Championship in 2006.

Rivalries

Saitama derby 
Urawa Red Diamonds has a local derby with Omiya Ardija, from Ōmiya-ku, Saitama city. They first met in the 1987 Emperor's Cup, with Mitsubishi defeating NTT Kanto by 5 to 0 at Nishigaoka National Stadium. The derby first took place in the JSL Second Division in the 1989–90 season, and it wouldn't take place until the 2000 season when Urawa was relegated to the second tier again. In 2003 the formerly separate Omiya and Urawa cities merged to become Saitama city, and since 2005 the derby became a top flight fixture after Omiya was promoted.

Marunouchi Gosanke 
During the JSL years and into the 1990s, Urawa's main top flight rivals were JEF United Chiba and Kashiwa Reysol, both now based in Chiba Prefecture. Because of their former parent companies' headquarters being all based in Marunouchi, Tokyo, the three clubs were known as the Marunouchi Gosanke (丸の内御三家, "Marunouchi Big Three") and fixtures among them were known as the Marunouchi derbies, although the term is falling out of use as they are now based in different prefectures and rarely play home games in Tokyo stadiums.

Others 
Rivals further afield include Kashima Antlers, FC Tokyo, Yokohama Marinos, Kawasaki Frontale, and, even farther away, Gamba Osaka. Old JSL championship rivalries with Sanfrecce Hiroshima, Cerezo Osaka and Shonan Bellmare have ebbed down as those clubs had nadirs in the 3 tier.

Women's and amateur teams
The club also has women's and amateur teams.
 Women's: Urawa Red Diamonds Ladies  in WE League
 Amateur: Urawa Red Diamonds Amateur in Saitama Prefecture League Div. 1

Kit and colours

Colours
The main colours of the Urawa Red Diamonds are red, black and white.

Kit evolution

League & cup record

Key

Honours

Domestic
As both Mitsubishi (amateur era) and Urawa Red Diamonds (professional era)

League
Japan Soccer League/J.League Division 1
Champions (5): 1969, 1973, 1978, 1982, 2006
Japan Soccer League Division 2
Champions (1): 1989–90

Cups
Emperor's Cup
Winners (8): 1971, 1973, 1978, 1980, 2005, 2006, 2018, 2021
JSL Cup/J.League Cup
Winners (4): 1978, 1981, 2003, 2016
Japanese Super Cup
Winners (5): 1979, 1980, 1983,  2006, 2022

International
AFC Champions League
Winners (2): 2007, 2017
J.League Cup / Copa Sudamericana Championship
Winners (1): 2017

Individual awards

Players

Current squad
.

Type 2

Out on loan

Reserve squad (U-18s)
; Squad for the 2022 season:

World Cup players
The following players have represented their country at the World Cup whilst playing for Urawa Red Diamonds:

World Cup 1998
 Masayuki Okano
 Shinji Ono
 Željko Petrović

World Cup 2006
 Alex
 Shinji Ono
 Keisuke Tsuboi

World Cup 2010
 Yuki Abe

World Cup 2014
 Shusaku Nishikawa

World Cup 2018
 Wataru Endo
 Tomoaki Makino
 Andrew Nabbout

World Cup 2022
 Hiroki Sakai

Club captains
 Koichi Shitani 1992–1993 
 Masahiro Fukuda 1994–1997 
 Takashi Tsuchida 1998–1999 
 Shinji Ono 2000–2001 
 Masami Ihara 2001–2002 
 Hideki Uchidate 2003 
 Nobuhisa Yamada 2004–2008 
 Keita Suzuki 2009–2011 
 Yuki Abe 2012–2017 
 Yōsuke Kashiwagi 2018–2019 
 Shusaku Nishikawa 2020–present

Former players

International capped players

Club officials 
For the 2023 season.

Manager history

League history
Excepting two seasons in which they were in the second tier, Mitsubishi/Urawa has always competed in the top flight, thereby being the club with the most top flight seasons total.
Mitsubishi (Amateur era)
Division 1 (JSL and JSL Div.1): 1965–66, 1988–89
Division 2 (JSL Div.2): 1989–90
Division 1 (JSL Div.1): 1990–91, 1991–92
Urawa Red Diamonds (Professional era)
Division 1 (J.League): 1993–99
Division 2 (J.League Div.2): 2000
Division 1 (J.League Div.1): 2001–
 Top scorer: Masahiro Fukuda with 152 goals

Notes

References

External links

  Urawa Red Diamonds official website 
  Urawa Red Diamonds Supporters Media website (unofficial) 

 
J.League clubs
Japan Soccer League clubs
Football clubs in Japan
Association football clubs established in 1950
Tourist attractions in Saitama Prefecture
Sports teams in Saitama (city)
Mitsubishi Motors
Emperor's Cup winners
Japanese League Cup winners
1950 establishments in Japan
AFC Champions League winning clubs